Paniewo Lock - ninth lock on the Augustów Canal (from the Biebrza). The only twin-chamber lock on the Augustów Canal in Poland.

Built between 1826 - 1828 by Michał Horain. Due to the large difference in levels between Lake Paniewo and Lake Krivoy, which is more than 6 m lock consists of two interconnected chambers, and the time of going through is about 40 minutes. The enormous pressure of water and ground water filtration strong meant that even before World War I was necessary overhaul.

Was destroyed during World War II, including the successful action of sabotage carried out by the troops of Army 20 July 1944

After the war, the lock repaired in years:
 1947 - 1948: reconstruction of war damages
 1951: an attempt to seal the soil by electroosmosis
 1953 - 1954: replacement of the wooden floor of reinforced concrete, filling the cavities formed concrete, drainage along the walls
 1970: a rescue attempt by injections of concrete structures
 1973 - 1979 has been completely demolished a lock, then was rebuilt using modern materials and techniques, but preserving the original appearance and operating system.
 Location: 61 km canal
 Level difference: 6.29 m
  Length: 88 m (first chamber: 41.41 m, second chamber: 43.64 m)
 Width: 5.95 m
 Gates: Wooden
 Year built: 1826 - 1828
 Construction Manager: Michał Horain

References

 
 
 

19th-century establishments in Poland
Paniewo